Vence Cathedral is a Roman Catholic church located in the town of Vence, France. The former cathedral is a national monument.

The cathedral was previously the seat of the Bishopric of Vence, abolished by the Concordat of 1801, when its territory was passed to the Diocese of Nice.

See also
Chapelle du Rosaire de Vence

External links

 
 Location of the cathedral
 Photo of Vence Cathedral
 Photo of Vence Cathedral

Former cathedrals in France
Churches in Alpes-Maritimes